Maksymilian Rogalski (born 24 June 1983) is a Polish former footballer who played as a defensive midfielder.

Career 

Rogalski started his career with Raków Częstochowa.

External links

References

1983 births
Living people
Association football midfielders
Polish footballers
Ekstraklasa players
Pogoń Szczecin players
Raków Częstochowa players
Wisła Płock players
Sportspeople from Częstochowa